The South Lahonton hydrologic region encompasses several interior basins east of the Sierra Nevada and the Transverse Ranges, with an area of . It covers the western portion of the Mojave Desert and a southwestern portion of the Great Basin desert, and extends into the forests of the southeastern Sierra Nevada and the montane chaparral and woodlands of the northeastern Transverse ranges.

The region is closed or endorheic, and none of its rivers or streams reach the sea. They instead empty into lake beds from which the water evaporates, leaving deposits of salts and other minerals. There are some year-round mountain streams and springs, but most the large rivers are intermittent, and the lakes vary in extent based on variations in rainfall and runoff.

Perennial streams include the Owens River and tributaries to Mono Lake, such as Rush Creek and Lee Vining Creek. Drainage basins include the Antelope Valley watershed, the Mojave watershed, Mono Basin, the Owens River watershed, and the Amargosa River watershed.

References

Endorheic basins of the United States